The men's tournament of water polo at the 2004 Summer Olympics at Athens, Greece, began on August 15 and lasted until August 29, 2004.

Squads

Preliminary round
All times are Eastern European Time (UTC+3)

Group A

Group B

Medal round bracket

Classification 7th-12th

Quarterfinals

Classification 11th-12th

Classification 7th-10th

Semifinals

9th place match

7th place match

5th place match

Bronze-medal match

Gold-medal match

Ranking and statistics

Final rankings

Multi-time Olympians

Five-time Olympian(s): 2 players
 : Salvador Gómez, Jesús Rollán (GK)

Four-time Olympian(s): 8 players
 : Dubravko Šimenc
 : Konstantinos Loudis
 : Tibor Benedek
 : Carlo Silipo
 : Dmitry Gorshkov, Nikolay Kozlov
 : Daniel Ballart, Sergi Pedrerol

Multiple medalists

Three-time Olympic medalist(s): 2 players
 : Dmitry Gorshkov, Nikolay Kozlov

Leading goalscorers

Source: Official Results Book (page 184)

Leading goalkeepers

Source: Official Results Book (page 180)

Leading sprinters

Source: Official Results Book (page 183)

Awards
The men's all-star team was announced on 29 August 2004.

Most Valuable Player
  Gergely Kiss (left-handed, 14 goals)

Media All-Star Team
 Goalkeeper
  Denis Šefik (60 saves)
 Field players
  Theodoros Chatzitheodorou (8 goals)
  Revaz Chomakhidze (centre forward, 15 goals)
  Tamás Kásás (14 goals, 7 sprints won)
  Gergely Kiss (left-handed, 14 goals)
  Aleksandar Šapić (18 goals)
  Vladimir Vujasinović (centre back, 3 goals)

References

Sources
 PDF documents in the LA84 Foundation Digital Library:
 Official Results Book – 2004 Olympic Games – Water Polo (download, archive)
 Water polo on the Olympedia website
 Water polo at the 2004 Summer Olympics (men's tournament)
 Water polo on the Sports Reference website
 Water polo at the 2004 Summer Games (men's tournament) (archived)

External links
BBC Men's water polo results 
BBC match schedule

Water polo at the 2004 Summer Olympics
Men's events at the 2004 Summer Olympics